The following songs were produced by 9th Wonder.

2002

Cesar Comanche - Paper Gods 
 04. "Knowing is Half the Battle" (feat. Justus League, Sean Boog)
 05. "Land of Hate"
 06. "Underground Heaven"
 07. "A-Game"
 08. "WJLR Evening" (feat. 9th Wonder)
 09. "Drought of 2002"
 10. "Edited for T.V."
 11. "Trust II" (feat. Sean Boog)
 13. "Daily Operation" (feat. L.E.G.A.C.Y. & Sean Boog)
 16. "WJLR Night" (feat. Edgar Allen Floe)

Binky Fingers - Where's Calvin? 
 02. "Where's Calvin?"
 04. "I Don't Care"
 05. "Come On"
 06. "PMS"
 10. "Fly Away" (feat. Little Brother & Big Dho)
 11. "Hey Binky" (feat. Phonte)
 13. "The Line"
 15. "Ladies Man" (feat. Phonte)
 17. "As I Die Slowly"

2003

Jay-Z - The Black Album 
 07. "Threat"

Little Brother - The Listening 

 01. "Morning"
 02. "Groupie Pt. II"
 03. "For You"
 04. "Speed"
 05. "Whatever You Say"
 06. "Make Me Hot"
 07. "The Yo Yo"
 08. "Shorty On The Lookout" (feat. Median)
 09. "Love Joint Revisited"
 10. "So Fabulous"
 11. "The Way You Do It"
 12. "Roy Lee, Producer Extraordinaire"
 13. "The Get Up" (co-produced by Eccentric)
 14. "Away From Me"
 15. "Nobody But You" (feat. Keisha Shontelle)
 16. "Home"
 17. "Nighttime Maneuevers"
 18. "The Listening"

2004

De La Soul - The Grind Date 
 06. "Church" (feat. Spike Lee)

Masta Ace - A Long Hot Summer 
 03. "Good Ol' Love"

Destiny's Child - Destiny Fulfilled 
 05. "Is She the Reason"
 06. "Girl"
 12. "Game Over"

Jean Grae - This Week 
 08. "Supa Luv"
 16. "Don't Rush Me"

Consequence - Take 'Em to the Cleaners 
 10. "I See Now" (feat. Kanye West & Little Brother)

2005

Kaze & 9th Wonder - Spirit of '94: Version 9.0

Cesar Comanche - Squirrel And The Aces 
 01. "Get Ready" (feat. Median)
 02. "The Life" (feat. Phonte & Darien Brockington)
 05. "Up & Down" (feat. Eternia)
 15. "Precious Time"
 17. "Outro"

Little Brother - The Minstrel Show 

01. "Welcome to the Minstrel Show"
02. "Beautiful Morning"
03. "The Becoming"
04. "Not Enough"
06. "Hiding Place"
07. "Slow It Down"
08. "Say It Again"
10. "Lovin' It"
11. "Diary of a Mad Black Daddy"
12. "All for You"
14. "Sincerely Yours"
15. "Still Lives Through"
16. "Minstrel Closing Theme"
17. "We Got Now"

Memphis Bleek - 534 
 10. "Smoke The Pain Away" (feat. Denim)
 12. "Alright"

Rapper Big Pooh - Sleepers 
 03. "Strongest Man"
 04. "Heart Of The City"
 05. "Every Block" (feat. Phonte)
 10. "Scars" (feat. Joe Scudda, Median)
 11. "Between The Lines"
 13. "Now"
 00. "Theme Music" (B-side to "The Strongest Man" VLS)

Sean Price - Monkey Barz 
 05. "Heartburn"

Mary J. Blige - The Breakthrough 
 06. "Good Woman Down"

L.E.G.A.C.Y. - Project Mayhem 
 04. "Lou's Tavern"
 06. "Nice"
 09. "Fast Girls"
 10. "Cold As A Butcher"
 11. "Insomnia"
 12. "Pain In Life"
 13. "Sista Girl" (feat. Keisha Shontelle)
 14. "Broken Heart Disease"
 16. "I'm Nothing"
 17. "2 Sided Coin"
 18. "Imperfect World" (feat. Keisha Shontelle, Percy Miracles)
 19. "Dirty Bomb"

2006

Boot Camp Clik - The Last Stand 
 01. "Here We Come"
 07. "Take a Look (In The Mirror)"
 11. "So Focused"

Lloyd Banks - Rotten Apple 
 14. "One Night Stand"

De La Soul - The Impossible: Mission TV Series - Pt. 1 
 17. "Freedom Train"

Obie Trice - Second Round's on Me 
 20. "Luv" (feat. Jaguar Wright)

Edgar Allen Floe - Floe Almighty 
 01. "Skyward"
 05. "Floe Almighty"
 07. "The Torch"
 12. "The Righteous Way To Go (Remix)"
 13. "Cruise"

2007

Little Brother - Getback 
 03. "Breakin' My Heart" (feat. Lil Wayne)

Boot Camp Clik - Casualties of War 
 07. "I Need More"

Sean Price - Jesus Price Supastar 
 03. "P-Body"
 06. "Violent"
 12. "You Already Know" (feat. Skyzoo)
 14. "Let It Be Known" (feat. Phonte)

Bishop Lamont - N*gger Noize 
 12. "First They Love You" (feat. Indef, Prime)

Bishop Lamont - Pope Mobile 
 06. "I Just Want the Money" (feat. Bokey)

Drake - Comeback Season 
 20. "Think Good Thoughts" (feat. Phonte & Elzhi)

2008

Ludacris - Theater of the Mind 
 14. "Do the Right Thang" (feat. Common & Spike Lee)

EPMD - We Mean Business 
 11. "Left 4 Dead" (feat. Skyzoo)

Erykah Badu - New Amerykah Part One (4th World War) 
 11. "Honey"

Murs - Murs for President 
 02. "I'm Innocent"
 12. "Love and Appreciate II" (feat. Tyler Woods)
 14. The Break up
 15. "Breakthrough"

Akrobatik - Absolute Value 
 06. "Be Prepared" (feat. Little Brother)

Royce da 5'9" - The Bar Exam 2: The Album 
 13. "On the Low"

2009

KRS-One & Buckshot - Survival Skills 
 14. "Past, Present, Future" (feat. Melanie Fiona & Naledge)

Kenn Starr - It's Still Real... 
 11. "Wonder Why" (feat. Big Sean, Mike Posner, Wale)
 18. "Sum Ish For Dave" (feat. Haysoos)

Big Pooh - The Delightful Bars (The North American Pie Version) 
 14. "Rear View Mirror"

Cesar Comanche - Die In Your Lap 
 03. "Choose"
 08. "Hello World"
 09. "Hands High"
 10. "What's Wrong"
 15. "Reborn"

Skyzoo - The Salvation 
 03. "The Beautiful Decay"
 06. "Like a Marathon"
 08. "Under Pressure"
 13. "Easy to Fly" (feat. Carlitta Durand)
 15. "Metal Hearts"

Wale & 9th Wonder - Back To The Feature

2010

Asher Roth - Seared Foie Gras w/ Quince & Cranberry (Mixtape) 
4. "Vagitables"

Big Remo - Wonderbread - EP 
1. "Wonderbread" (feat. David Banner)
4. "Penny For Your Thoughts"
5. "The Build Up"

Big Remo - 9th Wonder Presents Big Remo: Entrapment 
3. "The Game (Tre 4)"
5. "Wonderbread" (feat. David Banner)
9. "Go Ladies" (feat. Robert Alred)
10. "Woop Woop (Stand Back)" (feat. Ricky Ruckus and 9thMatic)

Sadat X - Wild Cowboys II 

14. "X and Bill" (feat. Ill Bill)

Actual Proof - The (Fre)EP 

04. "Peace From The Riddler (Enigma)"
05. "Skate Kids"
07. "The Sandbox"
08. "Let's Go" (feat. Rapsody)
10. "It's Cool" (feat. Rapsody)
11. "I Just Wanna Be" (feat. King Mez & TP)
12. "Dig It"
13. "Buzz Lightyear"
14. "Genius"
15. "Hot"
17. "Coast"

Christopher Williams - The Way You Feel (CDS) 

00. "The Way You Feel"

Heather Victoria - Victoria's Secret 

12. "Loves You"
13. "Never Let You Go"

Rapsody - Return of the B-Girl 

01. "Intro"
05. "Blankin’ Out" (feat. Mac Miller)
06. "Cherry On Top"
07. "Little Things" (feat. Phil Ade)
10. "U Sparklin'"
11. "Make It After All"
12. "U Make Me Say" (feat. Heather Victoria)
14. "No More Trouble" (feat. Enigma, Halo & Sean Boog)
15. "Cipher Kid" (feat. Big Remo)
16. "Angel" (feat. Laws)
17. "Young Black With A Gift" (feat. Big Daddy Kane)
18. "Little Things (Remix)" (feat. Thee Tom Hardy & Heather Victoria)
19. "Honda Accord (Remix)" (feat. Skyzoo & Thee Tom Hardy)
20. "My Melo My Man (Melo Anthony)" (feat. TP)

Sean Boog - Light Beers Ahead of You 

11. "Never Settle" (feat. Halo, Rapsody & Sundown)
16. "Moves (Stop)" (feat. TP & GQ)
18. "HuH" (feat. 9thmatic)
20. "Heroes" (feat. Big Remo, King Mez, Halo, GQ, TP & Rapsody)
22. "Standing O"

Thee Tom Hardy - The Hardy Boy Mystery Mixtape: Secret of thee Green Magic 

05. "I’m Grinnin’"
10. "Take Em to…" (feat. Yelawolf)
11. "A Different League" (feat. Skyzoo)
12. "Always in Command"

David Banner & 9th Wonder - Death of a Popstar 

01. "Diamonds On My Pinky" (Produced with David Banner & THX)
02. "No Denying (Channel 3)" (Produced with W. Campbell & David Banner)
03. "Mas 4"
05. "Slow Down" (feat. Heather Victoria) (Produced with W. Campbell & David Banner)
06. "Be With You" (feat. Ludacris & Marsha Ambrosius) (Produced with W. Campbell & David Banner)
07. "Stutter" (feat. Anthony Hamilton) (Produced with W. Campbell & David Banner)
08. "Silly" (feat. Erykah Badu) (Produced with David Banner & THX)
09. "Something Is Wrong" (feat. Lisa Ivey) (Produced with W. Campbell & David Banner)
10. "Strange" (feat. Big Remo) (Produced with W. Campbell & David Banner)

Laws - 5:01 Overtime 
15. "Shining"

2011

Actual Proof - The Talented Tenth 

01. Dream"
02. "Let Me Ride"
08. "All in My Mind"
10. "The Talented Tenth"
11. "Super Genius" (feat. Cutlass Reid, Skewby, Naledge, Add2theMC, Kendrick Lamar, Brittany Street, The Kid Daytona & Laws)

HaLo - Heat Writer II 

04. "Boom Bap for the Radio"
16. "So Vibrant" (feat. Sundown & E. Jones)
17. "Shinin' (You Are Here)"
18. "Plan B" (feat. TP & Skyzoo)

Tyler Woods - The Mahogany Experiment 

01. "Stayed Away Too Long"
02. "Only Knew" (Featuring Styles P)
04. "I Wanna Love You (The Jodeci Tribute)"
05. "Be Together"
06. "I Want U"
07. "De Listen Jam"
08. "Ms. Diva" (featuring Talib Kweli)
09. "Silence" (featuring Hos)
10. "If I..."
11. "You & Me" (featuring Heather Victoria)
12. "This Goes Out 2 U"
13. "Heaven" (featuring Big Remo)
14. "Never Got Over (The Al Green Tribute)"

Terrace Martin - The Sex EP 

00. "Never Stop Loving You"

Lil B - Base For Your Face 

00. "Base For Your Face" (feat. Jean Grae & Phonte)

TP - TP Is My Hero 

05. "I Found It"
07. "Man Up/Woman Up"
10. "Baby"
11. "All You Need Is Me" (feat. Big Remo)
16. "Keep Goin' On"

Big Remo - L-R-G Presents Robin Hood Ree 

05. "Baby Mama House"
07. "Robinhood Ree"
12. "Know How It Goes Down"
16. "Yota Music" (feat. Enigma)
18. "Get Back Down"
19. "Cipher Kid (Remix)" (feat. Rapsody)
21. "Slumdog Millionaire"
22. "Y'all Ain't Pimpin'" (feat. Tyler Woods)

Heather Victoria - Graffiti Diary 

07. "Tore My Head Up"
11. "Time Is The Teacher"

Sean Boog - Phantom of the Jamla 

03. "Morning"
06. "Fight The Feeling" (feat. Halo, Rapsody & Tyler Woods)
13. "Weirdo Shit" (feat. Halo, Enigma & Sundown)
14. "Get It Together"

Skyzoo - The Great Debater 

04. "Designer Drugs"
10. "Get Him To The Greek"

Rapsody - Thank H.E.R. Now 

02. "Thank H.E.R. Now"
03. "Lemme Think"
04. "Black Girl Jedi"  (feat. Heather Victoria)
09. "One Time" (feat. Tab One, Charlie Smarts & Phonte)
11. "Fly GIrl Power!"  (feat. Estelle)
13. "Sky Fallin' (My Mind)"
15. "Baby Yeah!" (feat. Marsha Ambrosius)
16. "So Be It" (feat. Big K.R.I.T.)
17. "Black Diamonds" (feat. Raekwon)
00. "Hella High"

Actual Proof - Still Hotter Than July 

01. "Get It Done"
09. "The Marvel" (feat. Chuuwee)
11. "Zonin' (Blaow)"
12. "Light of Day" (feat. GQ)

Chris Brown - Boy In Detention 

09. "Real Hip Hop #4" (feat. Kevin McCall)
12. "Real Hip Hop #3"

Median - The Sender 

03. "Open My Thoughts"
07. "Fresh Breath" (featuring Sundown & King Mez)
09. "Right On" (featuring Halo)
12. "Kiss the Sky" (featuring Sy Smith)
13. "The Sender"

HaLo - The Blind Poet 

01. "Rude Awakening"
06. "Lesson In Keys"
10. "Birth Of A Sucka" (featuring Thee Tom Hardy)

9th Wonder - The Wonder Years 

 "Make It Big" (featuring Khrysis)
 "Band Practice Pt. 2" (featuring Phonte & Median)
 "Enjoy" (featuring Warren G, Murs & Kendrick Lamar)
 "Streets of Music" (featuring Tanya Morgan & Enigma of Actual Proof)
 "Hearing the Melody" (featuring Skyzoo, Fashawn & King Mez)
 "Loyalty" (featuring Masta Killa & Halo)
 "Now I'm Being Cool" (featuring Mela Machinko & Median)
 "Never Stop Loving You" (featuring Terrace Martin & Talib Kweli)
 "Piranhas" (featuring Sene & Sundown of Actual Proof)
 "Peanut Butter & Jelly" (featuring Marsha Ambrosius)
 "One Night" (featuring Terrace Martin, Phonte, & Bird and The Midnight Falcons)
 "Your Smile" (featuring Holly Weerd & Thee Tom Hardy)
 "No Pretending" (featuring Raekwon & Big Remo)
 "20 Feet Tall" (featuring Erykah Badu & Rapsody)
 "That's Love" (featuring Mac Miller & Heather Victoria)
 "A Star U R" (featuring Terrace Martin, Problem & GQ)

Phonte - Charity Starts At Home 

02. "The Good Fight"
04. "Not Here Anymore" (feat. eLZhi)
05. "Eternally" (feat. Median)
11. "The Life of Kings" (feat. Evidence & Big K.R.I.T.)

Torae - For the Record 

05. "Shakedown"
11. "Only Way (Interlude)"

Rapsody - For Everything 

01. "Pace Myself"
02. "The Autobiography of M.E."
03. "A Crush Groove"
04. "The Woman's Work"
08. "Jamla Girls/Jamla Boys"
14. "Dear Friends"

GQ - Troubled Man 

02. "Swag Like A Ball Player"
14. "Met U"

Heather Victoria - Hip Hop Soul Lives 

02. "Not Taking You Back" (featuring Rapsody)
08. "You and Me" (featuring Tyler Woods)

2012

Raekwon - Unexpected Victory 

04. "A Pinebox Story"

Rapsody - The Black Mamba EP 

02. "Right Now"
03. "Leave Me 'Lone"
06. "Respect Due"
07. "With You"

Actual Proof - Black Boy Radio 

07. "Poison Ivy Gloss" (featuring Geechi Suede)
11. "Show You the Way" (featuring TP)
17. "Sojourner Truth"

Add-2 - S.ave O.ur S.ouls 

03. "Going Going Gone" (featuring DeeJay Juice)

Lecrae - Church Clothes 
 07. "Rise"
 14. "Long Time Coming" (featuring Swoope)

Big Remo - Sleepwalkers 

 09. "How Deep" (featuring Bluu Suede)

Sean Boog - Sean Boogie Nights 

01. "Intro"
03. "Big Boy Music"
05. "A Love Never Dies" (featuring Rapsody & Khrysis)

Rapsody - The Idea of Beautiful 

 04. "Believe Me"
 05. "Non-Fiction" (featuring Raheem DeVaughn & Ab-Soul)
 06. "In The Drums" (featuring Heather Victoria)
 07. "Kinda Love" (featuring Nomsa Mazwai)
 10. "Good Good Love" (featuring BJ the Chicago Kid)
 11. "In The Town" (featuring Nomsa Mazwai)
 12. "Round Table Discussion" (featuring Mac Miller & The Cool Kids)
 15. "When I Have You" (featuring Nomsa Mazwai)
 16. "Believe Me (HaHaHaHa Remix)"
 18. "Thunder"

Torae - Off the Record 

 03. "Steady Mobbin'"
 08. "Only Way"

Talib Kweli - Attack the Block 

 14. "To the Music" (featuring Maino)

Skyzoo - A Dream Deferred 

 02. "Jansport Strings"

Sean Price - Mic Tyson 

 06. "Straight Music"

Robert Glasper Experiment - Black Radio Recovered: The Remix EP 

 01. "Afro Blue (9th Wonder Blue Light Basement Remix)" (featuring Erykah Badu & Phonte)

Buckshot & 9th Wonder - The Solution 

 01. "The Big Bang"
 02. "What I Gotta Say"
 03. "Stop Rapping"
 04. "Crazy"
 05. "The Feeling"
 06. "Sam"
 07. "Pat Em Down"
 08. "Keep It Going"
 09. "The Change Up"
 10. "Shorty Left" (featuring Rapsody)
 11. "You" (featuring Dyme-A-Duzin)
 12. "The Solution"

Murs & 9th Wonder - The Final Adventure 

 01. "Get Together" (featuring Rapsody)
 02. "Whatuptho"
 03. "Funeral for a Killer"
 04. "Baby Girl (Holding Hands)"
 05. "Walk Like a Woman"
 06. "Tale of Two Cities"
 07. "Dance with Me"
 08. "Better Way"
 09. "Wherever You Are"
 10. "It's Over"

Masta Killa - Selling My Soul 
 09. "Food"

Rapper Big Pooh - Sleepers: The Narcoleptic Outtakes 
 07. "Hate Bitches" (featuring O-Dash)

2013

GQ - Death Threats & Love Notes: The Prelude 
 05. "The Town"
 06. "Last Breath"

Big K.R.I.T. - King Remembered In Time 
 14. "Life Is A Gamble" (featuring BJ the Chicago Kid)
 "Gettin' Mine" (featuring Rapsody & Heather Victoria)
 "Reign On"

Locksmith - The Green Box 
 08. "Stand It" (featuring Anesha)

Heather Victoria - Black Girl Story 
 "Summer Day"

Rapsody - She Got Game
 02. "Coconut Oil" (featuring Raekwon & Mela Machinko)
 06. "Generation" (featuring Mac Miller & Jared Evan)
 09. "My Song" (featuring Mela Machinko)
 10. "Complacent" (featuring Problem)
 11. "Love After All" (featuring Gwen Bunn)
 15. "Never Know" (featuring Ab-Soul, Nipsey Hussle & Terrace Martin)
 16. "Jedi Code" (featuring Phonte & Jay Electronica)
 21. "IJS"
 "Mass Hysteria"

Terrace Martin - 3ChordFold 
 02. "Triangle Ship" (featuring Kendrick Lamar) (produced with Terrace Martin)
 04. "Something Else" (featuring Problem) (produced with Terrace Martin)
 09. "Move On" (produced with Terrace Martin)
 11. "Angel" (produced with Craig Brockman)

Fat Joe - The Darkside III 
 06. "9th Wonder"

Nipsey Hussle - Crenshaw 
 11. "Face the World"

Cory Mo - Take It or Leave It 
 11. "Special Delivery"

Rapper Big Pooh - Fat Boy Fresh, Vol. 3.5: Happy Birthday Thomas 
 17. "Jambalaya"

2014

Various Artists - 9th Wonder Presents: Jamla Is the Squad 
 08. BJ the Chicago Kid & Add-2 - "15 Minutes of Fame"
 10. Rapsody - "Betty Shabazz"
 12. GQ - "Rated Oakland"
 14. Terrace Martin - "Shinin' Star" (produced with Terrace Martin)
 16. Buckshot - "At Night (3am Sh*t)"
 19. Rapsody - "Illuminaughty"
 20. Add-2 - "Iron Mic"
 23. Joey Fatts & Rapsody - "All Good"

Verbal Kent - Sound of the Weapon 
 14. "Sound of the Weapon (9th Wonder Remix)"

GQ - Rated Oakland 
 04. "Count 'Em Up" (featuring Nipsey Hussle & Rapper Big Pooh)
 07. "Falls Down" (featuring Problem & Bad Lucc)
 13. "Come On Home"

Ea$y Money - The Motive of Nearly Everybody, Yo 
 10. "Takin It With Me"

Dilated Peoples - Directors of Photography 
 16. "The Bigger Picture" (featuring Krondon)

Ed O.G. - After All These Years 
 02. "Back and Forth" (featuring King Magnetic)

HaLo - Mansa Musa 
 08. "Figure It Out" (featuring Masta Killa & Median)

Rapsody - Beauty and the Beast
 03. "Hard to Choose"
 07. "Godzilla"
 09. "Coming for You"
 13. "Believe Her" (featuring Merna)

2015

King Magnetic - Timing Is Everything
03. "Under Pressure"
11. "Believe" (featuring DJ Express)
16. "Kidnapped" (featuring Rapsody)

Jill Scott - Woman
16. "Beautiful Love" (featuring BJ the Chicago Kid)

Add-2 - Prey For the Poor
06. "Kool Aid" (featuring Rapsody and Sam Trump)
08. "Set It Off"

XL (Sadat X & El Da Sensei)
00. "We Must Stand"

Big Grams (Big Boi & Phantogram) - Big Grams
04. "Put It On Her"

Termanology - Term Brady - EP
05. "Grade A"

Big K.R.I.T.
00. "Guillotine Flow" (featuring Rapsody)

Talib Kweli & 9th Wonder - Indie 500
05. "Prego" (featuring Pharoahe Monch & Slug)
06. "Life Ahead of Me" (featuring Rapsody)
07. "Great Day in the Morning" (featuring Add-2)
08. "Don't Be Afraid" (featuring Rapsody, Problem & Bad Lucc)

Murs & 9th Wonder - Brighter Daze
 01. "The Battle"
 02. "God Black/Black God"
 03. "How to Rob with Rob"
 04. "Lover Murs"
 05. "Get Naked" (featuring Problem)
 06. "The Shutters" (featuring Bad Lucc & Reuben Vincent)
 07. "Wait...Back It Up"
 08. "If This Should End"
 09. "Walk Like a God" (featuring Rapsody & Propaganda)
 10. "Otha Fish"
 11. "No Shots" (featuring Mac Miller, Vinny Radio, Franchise & Choo Jackson)
 12. "Murs SuperStar"

2016

Anderson .Paak - Malibu
04. "The Season / Carry Me"
07. "Without You" (featuring Rapsody)

Vice Souletric - Vice for President, Vol. 2
11. "Respect the Legends" (featuring King Magnetic)

Miles Davis & Robert Glasper - Everything's Beautiful
05. "Violets" (featuring Phonte)

Rapsody - Crown
 01. "Crown" (produced with Eric G)
 02. "Gonna Miss You" (featuring Raphael Saadiq)
 04. "#Goals"
 06. "Take It Slow" (produced with Khrysis)
 07. "Through with Him"
 08. "2 AM" (featuring Ab-Soul) (produced with Khrysis)
 10. "Fire" (featuring Moonchild) (produced with Ka$h & Khrysis)

GQ
 "Guns Hang High" (featuring Rapsody) (produced with Khrysis)

2017

King Magnetic - Everything Happens 4 A Reason
11. "Eyes" (featuring Recognize Ali & DJ Express)

Kendrick Lamar - DAMN.
14. "Duckworth"

Rapsody - Laila's Wisdom
02. "Power" (featuring Kendrick Lamar & Lance Skiiiwalker)
05. "Ridin'" (featuring GQ) (produced with Eric G)
07. "Nobody" (featuring Anderson .Paak, Black Thought & Moonchild) (produced with Khrysis)
08. "Black & Ugly" (featuring BJ the Chicago Kid)
09. "You Should Know" (featuring Busta Rhymes)
10. "A Rollercoaster Jam Called Love" (featuring Musiq Soulchild & Gwen Bunn)
11. "U Used 2 Love Me" (featuring Terrace Martin)
12. "Knock on My Door" (featuring BJ the Chicago Kid)
14. "Jesus Coming" (featuring Amber Navran)

Masta Killa - Loyalty Is Royalty
03. "Loyalty Is Royalty (R.I.F. - Rapping Is Fundamental)"
07. "Trouble"
09. "Down with Me" (featuring Sean Price)

Problem - Selfish
03. "Top Off" (featuring Airplane James)

2018

Black Thought - Streams of Thought, Vol. 1
01. "Twofifteen"
02. "9th vs. Thought"
03. "Dostoyevsky" (featuring Rapsody)
04. "Making a Murderer" (featuring Styles P)

Westside Gunn - Supreme Blientele
16. "Wrestlemania 20" (featuring Anderson .Paak)

Victory - The Broken Instrument
02. "Open Your Eyes"

Milez Grimez, Swann Notty - Murderous & Venomous
04. "Stunt Dobles" (featuring Mekalek)

Various Artists – 9th Wonder Presents: Jamla is the Squad II
 10. Busta Rhymes - "Jumpin'" 
 11. Black Thought - "Cojiba" (co-produced with Eric G.) 
 13. Ian Kelly & Swank - "Do Something" 
 14. Rapsody - "Sojourner" (featuring J. Cole) 
 15. SiR - "Nothing Greater" 
 18. Big K.R.I.T., Jakk Jo & David Banner - "Knocking at My Door"

Anderson .Paak - Oxnard
06. "Saviers Road"

2019

Smif-n-Wessun - The All
03. "DreamLand" (feat. Raekwon & Heather Victoria)
05. "Let It Go"
08. "The A.L.L."

2 Chainz - Rap or Go to the League
02. "Threat 2 Society"

Rapsody - Eve
02. "Cleo"
08. "Maya" (feat. K. Roosevelt
09. "Ibtihaj" (feat. D'Angelo & GZA)
11. "Reyna's Interlude"
13. "Iman" (feat. SiR & JID)
15. "Sojourner" (feat. J. Cole)
16. "Afeni" (feat. PJ Morton)

Murs - The Iliad Is Dead and the Odyssey Is Over
01. "The Hulk"
02. "Cancun '" (feat. Pookie Blow & $ilk Money)
03. "My Hero" (feat. Heather Victoria)
04. "Ga$ Station Gucci Belt"
05. "Unicorn Glitter"
06. "High Noon" (feat. Rapsody & Reuben Vincent)
07. "Night Shift"
08. "Give Me a Reason"
09. "Super Cojo Bros." (feat. GQ & Cojo)
10. "F**k Them"
11. "Tony Robbins Pocketbook"
12. "Sin"

2020

4-IZE - Look Into My Ize
15. "How'd That Work Out"

Busta Rhymes - Extinction Level Event 2: The Wrath of God
15. "Best I Can" (featuring Rapsody)

Russ - CHOMP
05. "Momentum" (featuring Black Thought, Benny The Butcher)

Conway the Machine - From King to a God
18. "Serena vs. Venus"

2021

Russ - CHOMP 2
04. "Salute" (featuring Westside Gunn & Styles P)

Ultra Beast - Put 'Cha Teeth On It
12. "Something About You" (featuring Scar)

2022

Phife Dawg - Forever
02. "Only a Coward"

Singles produced by 9th Wonder
2002: "Whatever You Say" (Little Brother)
2004: "Bad Man" (Murs)
2005: "Girl" (Destiny's Child)
2005: "Lovin' It" (Little Brother feat. Joe Scudda)
2006: "Here We Come" (Bootcamp Clik)
2008: "Honey" (Erykah Badu)
2008: "Go All Out" (Buckshot feat. Carlitta Durand)
2009: "The Beautiful Decay" (Skyzoo)
2010: "The Problem Is" (Murs feat. Sick Jacken & Uncle Chucc)
2010: "Easy To Fly" (Skyzoo feat. Carlitta Durand)
2010: "Slow Down" (David Banner feat. Heather Victoria)
2010: "Be With You" (David Banner feat. Ludacris & Marsha Ambrosius) (Produced with W. Campbell & David Banner)
2010: "Genius" (Actual Proof)
2010: "Woop Woop (Stand Back)" (Big Remo feat. Ricky Ruckus & 9thMatic) 
2011: "You & Me" (Tyler Woods feat. Heather Victoria)
2011: "Black Girl Jedi" (Rapsody feat. Heather Victoria)
2011: "Not Here Anymore" (Phonte feat. Elzhi)
2011: "Band Practice Pt. II" (9th Wonder feat. Phonte & Median)

See also 
It's A Wonderful World Music Group

References

External links
 9th Wonder at Hip Hop Galaxy
 

Production discographies
Discographies of American artists
Hip hop discographies